Armigeres (Leicesteria) magnus is a species complex of zoophilic mosquito belonging to the genus Armigeres. It is found in Sri Lanka, Bangladesh, Cambodia, Indonesia, Laos, Macau, India, Malaysia, Nepal, Philippines, Myanmar, Thailand, Vietnam, Taiwan, Indochina, China, and Sumatra. Female is a typical human blood sucker. It breeds in Nepenthes species.

References

External links
Armigeres magnus (mosquito)
Notes on philippine mosquitoes. i. the armigeres group
Urbanization and Its Effects on the Ecology of Mosquitoes in Macau, Southeast Asia

magnus
Insects described in 1908